Barbodes baoulan, known locally as the Baolan, was a species of cyprinid endemic to Lake Lanao in Mindanao, the Philippines where it was found in deeper waters.  This species reached a length of  SL. It is now considered extinct.

References

Barbodes
Freshwater fish of the Philippines
Endemic fauna of the Philippines
Fauna of Mindanao
Fish described in 1926
Taxonomy articles created by Polbot